The Rapp-class torpedo boats were a class of six torpedo boats built in Norway for the Royal Norwegian Navy from 1952 to 1956. They were the first Norwegian-built torpedo boats after World War II, and were designed in light of experience from operations in this war. The boats were slightly larger than the Elco class.

All six boats were built by Westermoen Båtbyggeri og Mek Verksted, Mandal, with the first, Rapp launched on 7 May 1952 and completed on 18 November 1952. The five remaining boats were completed between 1953 and 1956. All six boats were stricken in 1970.

The class was designed, constructed and scale tested by Harald Henriksen in 1946. The same design was used for 16 patrol boats delivered to the Swedish navy. Henriksen later designed the Storm class, the Snøgg class and the Hauk class.

Boats in class

 Rapp P 351
 Rask P 352
 Kvikk P 353
 Kjapp P 354
 Snar P 355
 Snögg P 356

References

 Blackman, Raymond V. B. Jane's Fighting Ships 1962–63. London: Sampson Low, Marston & Company, 1962.
 Gardiner, Robert and Stephen Chumbley. Conway's All The World's Fighting Ships 1947–1995. Annapolis, Maryland USA: Naval Institute Press, 1995. .

Torpedo boats of the Royal Norwegian Navy
Patrol boat classes
Patrol vessels of the Royal Norwegian Navy